Monk Sherborne is a village in north Hampshire, England.

Sherborne Priory is the burial place of William of Drogheada.

Governance
Monk Sherborne is a civil parish and is part of the Sherborne St. John ward of Basingstoke and Deane borough council. The borough council is a Non-metropolitan district of Hampshire County Council.

References

External links

Villages in Hampshire
Civil parishes in Basingstoke and Deane